Parid Xhihani (born 18 July 1983) is an Albanian retired professional footballer who last played as a midfielder for hometown club Besa Kavajë.

Club career
During the 2008–09 summer transfer season, he transferred to Zorya in the Ukrainian Premier League from Albanian Premier League side Besa Kavajë. Xhihani was one of six player to sue their club, KS Kastrioti, for failing to pay their salaries in May 2012.

International career
He made his debut for Albania in June 2010 friendly match against Andorra in Tirana, coming on as a second-half substitute for Jahmir Hyka. It proved to be his sole international game.

References

External links

 
 Official Website Profile
 Profile on Football Squads

1983 births
Living people
Footballers from Kavajë
Albanian footballers
Association football midfielders
Albania international footballers
Besa Kavajë players
KS Shkumbini Peqin players
FK Dinamo Tirana players
KF Teuta Durrës players
FC Zorya Luhansk players
KS Kastrioti players
Kategoria Superiore players
Ukrainian Premier League players
Albanian expatriate footballers
Expatriate footballers in Ukraine
Albanian expatriate sportspeople in Ukraine